Sparkassen Arena is an indoor arena in Jena, Germany. It serves as the home arena for Science City Jena of the Basketball Bundesliga. It has a seating capacity of 3,000. The naming sponsor was a local savings bank, Sparkasse Jena-Saale-Holzland.

In 2021, it hosted the PDC World Cup of Darts, which was won by Scotland.

References

External links

 Official Website

Indoor arenas in Germany
Basketball venues in Germany
Buildings and structures in Jena
Sports venues in Thuringia